Sekar Ayyanthole (born 1954) is a painter, art teacher and former president of Kerala Chithrakala Parishath

Birth
Born in Ayyanthole, Thrissur, Kerala, South India in 1954.

Education
Diploma in drawing and painting GOI (Govt. Occupational Institute - now College of Fine Arts, Thrissur 1975.

Employment
Worked in Govt. Occupational Institute, Thrissur as Art Instructor in 1976 for less than a year.
Worked in Kerala Govt. Education Department as Art Teacher from 1978 to 2006.

Painting Exhibitions

Solo exhibitions

GOI Thrissur 1983, Edathanattukara, PGT 1987.  Ernakulam 1989. "Aa-96" Calicut 1996. Except 1989 all above are sponsored by KLK Academy.    "Ayyanthole -99" at   Chithram   Art Gallery Cochin 1999,   "6th Solo" at KLK
Academy Gallery, Cochin 2002, 7th Solo "Bikanir" at Thrissur 2006, 8th Solo "Iriyannni" at Chitrakala Parishat Gallery, Bangalore 2007.

Group Shows

"Dhanu - 53" Thrissur 1977. "Kalamela"  New Delhi through  KLK  Academy     at the time of  Third  Triannale 1978. Twenty  KLK  Academy  Annual  Exhibitions  since 1975.  All Chithram Gallery Annual Exhibitions since 1995. "Impasto-Twelve"an exhibition of eminent artists Yusuf Arakkal, Akkitham Narayanan etc. at Chithram Gallery 1996 "Inside of Outside" Inaugural Exhibition Synagogue Art Gallery Mattancherry 1998."41st National Exhibition by "Lalithkala Academy New Delhi 1999. National Exhibition by KCP at Kerala House New Delhi 2000. "KCP  National 2001" Exhibition by  KCP at     Venkatappa Gallery Bangalore 2001. Participated in 46th National Exhibition in 2004 at Cochi, by Lalithakala Academy, New Delhi.

Painting Camps

KCP  Camp  at  Thrissur 1976. State Artists  Camp at Neyyar by KLK Academy 1977. "Folk Art Camp" at Thrissur by KLK Academy in 1978. KLK Academy     Camp at Ottappalam 1979. KLK Academy State Camp at Calicut 1984.,Thrissur 1988.     Artists Camp at Peringode by Art Club 1991. " Painting  for Communal  Harmony"    with M. F. Husain 1992. Kozhikode Camp by  KCP (Universal Arts) 1994. National  Artists Camp     "Utharayanam" by Art Club Peringode  in 1994. Convener of "TVBN  Varnamelam"  National Artists  Camp  by  KCP at  Kumaranellur  1995. "Chithrakam" at  Mukkuthala  Malappuram by KCP 1995. National  Artists Camp  at  Kasaragode     by KLK Academy  1995. State Artists  Shadow Camp by KLK  Academy at  Kila- Thrissur  1997.    Artists Camp at Azheekal by KCP 1997.“ Theerakazhchakal ”at Alappuzha 1997. Neyyar  Dam  Camp by KCP 1999. All “Prakruthi”Annual State Camps by KCP since 1995. “Brush out AIDS” Cochin by KLK Academy 2002.“Nirakkoottam” Dist. Camp KLK Academy at Lakkidi as Camp Director 2003.“Kalakumbh” Senior     Artists Camp Bikanir - Rajasthan, Organized by AIFACS and  Rajasthan  Lalithakala  Academy, 2003.  “Varnam” National Artists Camp Organized by Pondicherry     Cultural Department  at  Mahi in 2004.

Awards
Honorable mention by KLK Academy for Painting “Anakkara” 1978. Cash Award by Kerala Chithrakala  Parishath  for “Omana” 1982. KCP Award by  Kerala  Chithrakala  Parishath for “ Omana-9 ” 1983. Honorable  mention by  KLK  Academy for “ Golden Temple ”  1984.   Samskarikakendram National Award for Drawing “Bull Festival” 1989. 2014 honourable mention for visual arts by Kerala Lalithakala Akademi

Special events
Conducted “Kalayathra” as  KCP State  Secretary - All  Kerala  Artists Tour  and on the  spot Painting  1997. Hon. Governor  of Kerala Sri. Sukh Dev Singh Kang      Visited “ KCP National  2000 ” and  invited all painters to  Rajbhavan for a friendly  talk      on paintings. Hon. Governor  bought  the painting “Vishu” and is now on display  at     Rajbhavan, Trivandrum.

Family
Wife: Omana C K

Sons: Jinan Sekhar, Dhanan Sekhar Edathara

References

External links
 New space for art (The Hindu Metro Plus Kochi)
 A pot pourri of paintings (The Hindu Metro Plus Kochi)
 Official website
 Facebook page

1954 births
Artists from Thrissur
20th-century Indian painters
Living people
Malayali people
Painters from Kerala
Indian male painters
20th-century Indian male artists